Michael Zaglmair (born 7 December 1987) is a former Austrian football goalkeeper.

Club career
He made his Austrian Bundesliga debut on 26 October 2007 against Rapid Vienna.

International career
He was part of the Austria U-21 team at the 2007 FIFA U-20 World Cup in Canada, appearing in four matches during the tournament and helping his team to reach the semi-finals.

References

External links

Guardian football

1987 births
Living people
Association football goalkeepers
Austrian footballers
Austria youth international footballers
LASK players
Austrian Football Bundesliga players